Odinism is a term for Heathenry, a modern pagan religion, typically used by those who hold to "folkish" or race-centric ideologies. 

Odinism may also refer to:
Old Norse religion

See also 
Odin
Odin Brotherhood
Odinic Rite
Odinist Fellowship
Wodenism, a term sometimes used for Anglo-Saxon paganism
Wotanism (disambiguation)